The Bras d'Henri is a tributary of the Beaurivage River which is a tributary of the west bank of the Chaudière River (slope of the south bank of the Saint-Laurent). It flows in the municipality of Saint-Elzéar, Saint-Bernard, Saint-Narcisse-de-Beaurivage, in the Saint-Étienne-de-Lauzon sector of the city of Lévis and Saint-Gilles, in the Lotbinière Regional County Municipality, in the administrative region of Chaudière-Appalaches, in Quebec, in Canada.

Geography 

The main neighboring watersheds of the Bras d'Henri river are:
 north side: Beaurivage River, Chaudière River, Cugnet River;
 east side: Malbrook stream, Chaudière River Vallée River, Savoie River;
 south side: Beaurivage River;
 West side: rivière aux Pins, Noire River, Rouge River, Beaurivage River.

From its source, the Bras d'Henri river flows mainly in agricultural areas over  divided into the following segments:
  northwesterly, in Saint-Elzéar, up to the limit of Saint-Bernard;
  north-west, to the route du rang Saint-Henri;
  north, up to the route du rang Saint-Georges-Ouest;
  north into Saint-Bernard, to the limit of Saint-Narcisse-de-Beaurivage;
  north-west, to a road;
  north-west, up to the limit of Saint-Étienne-de-Lauzon;
  towards the west, in Saint-Étienne-de-Lauzon, up to the limit of Saint-Narcisse-de-Beaurivage;
  towards the southwest, to route 218 (i.e. at the confluence of Petit bras d'Henri (coming from the south)) which drains the village of Saint-Narcisse-de-Beaurivage;
  north to a road;
  north-west, to its confluence.

Toponymy 
The toponym "Bras d'Henri" was made official on December 5, 1968, at the Commission de toponymie du Québec.

See also 

 List of rivers of Quebec

References 

Rivers of Chaudière-Appalaches
Lotbinière Regional County Municipality